Receptor expression-enhancing protein 5 is a protein that in humans is encoded by the REEP5 gene.
Receptor Expression Enhancing Protein is a protein encoded for in Humans by the REEP5 gene.

Gene 
REEP5 is located on chromosome 5 between base pairs 112876385 to 112922289 on the minus strand. The gene includes five exons. The genes DCP2 and SRP19  are located upstream and downstream of REEP5 in humans.

Protein 

The protein is a member of the REEP family, which generally facilitate intracellular trafficking through alterations to the endoplasmic reticulum, and which have the ability to enhance activity of G-protein coupled receptors. The human protein is 189 amino acids in length, containing two transmembrane regions and one named region- TB2_DP1_HVA22, The pre-modification protein mass is 21.5 kdal. Compared to the SwissProt collection of human proteins, REEP5 is composed of normal percentages of all amino acids. Aside from a long  stretch of electrically neutral amino acids, no significant patterns appear. A second isoform exists in humans, and is 131 amino acids in length as the result of a change after the 117th amino acid. Most of the fifth exon is not included.

Regulation

Gene level

Tissue expression 
REEP5 is expressed across a number of tissues at a relatively high level, with at least 20 Reads Per Kilobase of transcript, per Million mapped reads appearing in adrenal, fat, gall bladder, heart, kidney, prostate, lung, and urinary bladder tissues. Expression is even more highly elevated in brain and thyroid tissues.

Transcription factors 
EGR/Nerve Growth factor is a transcription factor with a potential binding site in the REEP5 promoter, which promotes neural plasticity, and therefore potentially provides an explanation for elevated levels of Receptor Expression Enhancing Protein 5 in the brain.

Additionally, two transcription factors related to heart development and function have possible binding sites in the promoter. Transcription Box 20 (TBX20) is related to heart development, with protein deficiencies linked to poor heart function in adult mice, and death in infants before gestation. MyoD is a Myogenic regulator which has been detected in the embryonic hearts of some birds in Purkinje cells, which are related to contractile function.

Protein level 
At the sub cellular level, REEP5 is expressed in the endoplasmic reticulum. Immunochemical staining localizes it here.

A number of post-translational modifications are computationally predicted in humans  and close orthologs. Acetylation of the second amino acid was predicted. Phosphorylation of the 150th amino acid is predicted in Humans, Mice and Chickens. O-GlcNac additions are also predicted at sites 128, 188, and 189. Sumoylation sites are predicted at amino acids 147, 175, 186, and 187. Propeptide cleavage was detected at amino acid 11.  Glycation was predicted at amino acids 16, 117, 164, 186, and 187.

Homology

Paralogs 
REEP5 has five paralogs in humans; REEP1, REEP2, REEP3, REEP4, and REEP

Orthologs 
REEP5 has orthologs as far removed from humans as Symbiodinium microadriacticum, a protist species. Sequence identity is high for vertebrates, but decreases significantly outside of this group. The DP1/TB2/HVA22 region is well conserved compared to the two transmembrane regions.

Evolutionary Rate
The evolutionary rate of the REEP5 protein is moderately high, falling between that of cytochrome c and fibrinogen alpha. Neutral mutations are expected to occur around once per one million years

Interacting partners 
REEP5 interacts with a number of proteins, including Regulator of G Protein signalling 2, which was detected using Yeast 2 Hybridization. RGS2 plays a role in G protein signalling 2 pathways and the contraction of smooth muscle tissues. Derlin 2 (Derl2) interacts with REEP5 as detected by anti-tag coimmunoprecipation and degrades misfolded glycoproteins in the endoplasmic reticulum. Cholinergic Receptor Muscarinic 5 was detected as an interactant by ubiquitin reconstruction. CHRM5 binds acetylcholine, and can impact the function of the central and peripheral nervous systems.

Four proteins were experimentally detected across several papers. Three of them, Atlastin GTPase 1, Atlastin GTPase 2, and Zinc Finger FYVE-Type Containing 27 are related to the structuring of the endoplasmic reticulum (tubules in particular), the development of axons, or neuron growth. The fourth is REEP6, which is responsible for transporting receptors to the cell surface, as well as regulating endoplasmic reticulum structure.

SARS-CoV-2 
REEP5 is one of many human proteins which interacts with SARS-CoV-2. Specifically, the coronavirus protein P0DTC5, which appears in the intermediate compartment between the endoplasmic reticulum and golgi apparatus, interacts with REEP5. P0DTC5 is a viral envelope protein which is crucial to viral morphogenesis, making it possible that REEP5 is related in someway to packaging or release of the virus from human cells.

Clinical significance 
Research has linked REEP5 to several diseases and disorders.

In colon cancer, expression of REEP5 enhances activity of CXCR1, a protein receptor which contributes to the growth and spread of cancer cells. Researchers have found that under expression of REEP5 reduces the efficiency of CXRC1, and reduces the ability of lung cancer cells to metastasize. This provides both a potential target for cancer therapy and further evidence of REEP5 having function as a protein which increases activity of other receptor proteins. Another type of cancer related to REEP5 is colon cancer, in which the protein normally interacts with and neutralizes HCCR1, a protein which would otherwise interfere with P53 and contribute to the  progression of cancer.

REEP5 has also been linked to heart disorders, and research into the connection has revealed that it helps organize the junctional Sarcoplasmic Reticulum in myocytes. REEP5 aligns the junctional SR to T-tubules, which promotes effective release of Calcium ions. When protein function is disrupted the junction becomes misaligned and Calcium ion release becomes less effective. Given the importance of Calcium ions to the muscle contractions which power the heart, targeting REEP5 has the potential to be a therapeutic option in some disorders.

Additionally, there is some statistical evidence linking certain SNPs found within REEP5 mRNA to Major Depressive Disorder. However, a biological mechanism has not been confirmed, and the study only looked at a limited population.

References

Further reading